The Trudel Glacier is a glacier at the head of Trudel Creek in southwestern British Columbia, Canada.

References

Glaciers of the Pacific Ranges